The Hypo Group Tennis International was an annual men's tennis tournament which was held between 1981 and 2008. During its lifetime it was organized in four locations in Italy and Austria. The event was part of the ATP Tour's World Series from 1990 to 1999 and of the ATP International Series from 2000 until the final edition in 2008. The tournament had been played on clay courts since its inaugural edition.

Past finals

Singles

Doubles

External links

 
Grand Prix tennis circuit
Tennis tournaments in Austria
Clay court tennis tournaments
ATP Tour
Defunct tennis tournaments in Europe
Defunct sports competitions in Austria